Winogradskyella undariae is a bacterium from the genus of Winogradskyella which has been isolated from the algae Undaria pinnatifida from Wando.

References

Flavobacteria
Bacteria described in 2014